American republic or republic of America may refer to:

Political geography 
 the United States of America
 other sovereign states in the Americas which are governed as republics
 former sovereign states in North America which were governed as republics
 former sovereign states in South America which were governed as republics

Business and industry 
 American Republic Insurance Company, headquartered at the American Republic Insurance Company Headquarters Building
 American Republics Corporation

Other 
 The American Republic, a 1865 book by Orestes Brownson

See also 
 America (disambiguation)
 American (disambiguation)
 US (disambiguation)
 USA (disambiguation)
 The United States of America (disambiguation)